Drypis is a flowering plant genus in the family Caryophyllaceae.

Species
 Drypis jacquiniana Murb.et Wettst.
 Drypis spinosa L.

References

Caryophyllaceae
Caryophyllaceae genera